The 1963–64 season was the 91st season of competitive football in Scotland and the 67th season of the Scottish Football League.

Scottish League Division One

Champions: Rangers
Relegated: Queen of the South, East Stirlingshire

Scottish League Division Two

Promoted: Greenock Morton, Clyde

In the league match between Forfar Athletic and East Fife on Wednesday, 22 April 1964, the result was Forfar 5, East Fife 4.

Cup honours

Other Honours

National

County

 - aggregate over two legs

Highland League

Scotland national team

Scotland shared the 1964 British Home Championship with  England and  Northern Ireland.
Key:
 (H) = Home match
 (A) = Away match
 BHC = British Home Championship

Notes and references

External links
Scottish Football Historical Archive

 
Seasons in Scottish football